

20th century

21st century

See also
 Timeline of Antarctic history
List of years by country

Years in Antarctica
Antarctica-related lists